Frederick and Pennsylvania Line Railroad Museum is an American nonprofit historic-preservation organization headquartered in Walkersville, Maryland. The Museum was named after the namesake railroad that was built in Frederick county in 1872.

Foundation
Frederick and Pennsylvania Line Railroad Museum, Inc. was founded in 2015 as a nonprofit historic preservation advocacy organization in Frederick County, Maryland. The organization has two volunteer board members and a host of volunteers who work to preserve and promote Frederick County's historic buildings, sites and neighborhoods.(Op. Cit.) The Museum has been helping historical and preservation associations, residents and volunteers advocate for the preservation and reuse of historic buildings and sites in Frederick county, Maryland. The Museum also offers technical assistance to preservation groups and communities.

See also
Frederick and Pennsylvania Line Railroad Company
History of Frederick County
Maryland Historical Society

External links 
 Frederick and Pennsylvania Line Railroad Museum – Website

References

Historic preservation organizations in the United States
Non-profit organizations based in Maryland
Organizations based in Maryland
Museums in Frederick County, Maryland
Organizations established in 2015
2015 establishments in Maryland